Young Foolish Happy is the second studio album by English singer Pixie Lott, released on 11 November 2011 by Mercury Records. Lott enlisted previous collaborators Mads Hauge, Phil Thornalley, Toby Gad, Steve Kipner and Andrew Frampton to handle production for the album, in addition to new collaborators such as Tim Powell, The Matrix and Rusko. The album also includes collaborations with artists such as Stevie Wonder and John Legend.

Upon its release, Young Foolish Happy was met with mixed reviews from music critics; while some reviewers found the album solid, others viewed it as formulaic and short of originality, and felt it lacks the "charm" of Lott's debut album, Turn It Up (2009). The album debuted at number 18 on the UK Albums Chart with first-week sales of 18,503 copies, failing to match the commercial success of its predecessor. It spawned the UK number-one single "All About Tonight" and the top-10 singles "What Do You Take Me For?" and "Kiss the Stars".

Background and release
Lott began work on the album in Los Angeles in January 2011. In April 2011 she told Digital Spy, "There are a couple of really cool collaborations on the album and I've already worked with some big people, but I can't say who they are just in case those tracks don't make the final cut", describing the sound as "still pop stuff, but maybe a little more soulful. That's the kind of thing that I'm into. That influence is stronger on this album." On 17 September 2011, Lott revealed the album title, which is inspired by The Tams' 1968 song "Be Young, Be Foolish, Be Happy". She stated, "It's a song I grew up listening to, from a young age. I grew up listening to a lot of soul music and I think this album sounds more this kind of way. It's a message that I've always really liked and I think it's important that need to people remember, it's just motivating and inspirational."

The album was initially scheduled for release in the United Kingdom on 7 November 2011, but it was eventually pushed back a week to 14 November. To celebrate the launch of the Pixie Collection, London-based women's clothing retailer Lipsy offered the first 10,000 customers a voucher to redeem on Lott's official website and obtain the album for £3 off.

Singles
"All About Tonight" was released on 2 September 2011 as the album's lead single. Lott premiered the song on BBC Radio 1's The Chris Moyles Show on 11 July 2011. It debuted at number one on the UK Singles Chart, becoming Lott's third UK number one. "All About Tonight" also reached number nine on the Irish Singles Chart, Lott's second highest-peaking single on the chart after "Boys and Girls" (2009).

Second single "What Do You Take Me For?", featuring rapper Pusha T, was released on 4 November 2011. The track reached number 10 on the UK Singles Chart and number 30 on the Irish Singles Chart.

"Kiss the Stars" was released on 29 January 2012 as third and final single from the album, peaking at number eight in the UK and number 33 in Ireland.

Critical reception

Young Foolish Happy received generally mixed reviews from music critics. Kim Dawson and John Earls of the Daily Star opined that "there's nothing foolish about [the] album" and that "[s]hirking teeny-bop options for proper soul passion helps her silky voice shine". BBC Music's Fraser McAlpine felt that the album has "little of the magic that characterised her debut's highs" and criticised Lott for "working with songwriters who are capable of a finely tuned pastiche or two", but nevertheless cited "Nobody Does It Better" and "You Win" as "notable exceptions". Rick Pearson of the London Evening Standard noted that Lott "opts for a more soulful direction this time around, something that works better with her wind tunnel of a vocal. She's still guilty of imitation rather than innovation, however, particularly on the synth-heavy 'All about Tonight', which is a craven rip-off of a Katy Perry record. But an identity is the only thing that's lacking here." AllMusic critic Stephen Thomas Erlewine named the "Motown-mythologizing" "Stevie on the Radio" one of the "brighter, better songs [on the album], largely because it has bigger beats and hooks", but commented that "the rest of the record has the form of a blockbuster record but lacks the requisite rhythms or hooks and its scale dampens Lott's spunky personality, which was her primary charm on her debut."

Ben Chalk of MSN Music wrote that while the ballads are "the real weak point", the uptempo material is "a vast improvement". Chalk continued, "Where debut Turn It Up showcased an original writing talent which belied the giggly blonde Essex girl persona, Young Foolish Happy sometimes lapses into a pastiche of Pixie's musical heroes." Duncan Gillespie of NME found "All About Tonight" and "What Do You Take Me For?" to be "quite good", but dismissed Lott's "Jools Holland-ready retropop collaboration with Stevie Wonder" as "horrible, but still not horrible enough. Rather than righteous ire, you're left with only a sense of moral and cultural confusion, rather as if you'd caught yourself lusting after an ironing board." Simon Gage of the Daily Express stated that although Young Foolish Happy is a "pretty solid album of bouncy pop numbers", artists like Adele, Lady Gaga and Katy Perry leave "artists like Pixie out in the cold", adding that the album "has all the catchiness you would expect from last year's golden girl, but this year is a very different place." Virgin Media's Ian Gittins agreed, commenting that the album is "adequate, but never special: lacking Perry's raunch, Gaga's glitz, Adele's larynx or Jessie J's sass, it looks like Pixie Lott is set to remain a decidedly B-list pop star." Kevin Mathews of Singaporean newspaper Today expressed that the album "contains enough vocal and rhythmic hooks to keep the pop public sated as tracks like 'Come Get It Now', 'All About Tonight' and 'Nobody Does It Better' deliver in all these departments with some aplomb. The rest of Young Foolish Happy does not stray too far from this formula, which should keep Pixie Lott in demand for the immediate future."

Commercial performance
Young Foolish Happy debuted at number 18 on the UK Albums Chart, selling 18,503 copies in its first week. The following week, it dropped 24 places to number 42. The album was certified Gold by the British Phonographic Industry (BPI) on 10 February 2012. As of August 2014, it had sold 102,888 copies in the United Kingdom. Young Foolish Happy also entered the Irish Albums Chart at number 33.

Track listing

Notes
  signifies a vocal producer
  signifies an additional vocal producer
  signifies a production assistant
  signifies an additional producer
  signifies a remixer and additional producer
 The Asian deluxe edition of the album has the same track listing as the Japanese edition, but does not include the song "Perfect" and all tracks after that song are listed as 13 to 22.

Personnel
Credits adapted from the liner notes of the deluxe edition of Young Foolish Happy.

Musicians

 Pixie Lott – vocals ; background vocals 
 Robin French – piano, keyboards, bass, backing vocals 
 Mr Hudson – piano, drums, guitars, percussion, saxophone, Hammond organ, keyboards, bass, backing vocals 
 Rosie Oddie – backing vocals 
 Holly Muir – backing vocals 
 Felicia Barton – additional background vocals 
 Pusha T – vocals 
 David Ralicke – horns 
 Tim Powell – keyboards, programming 
 Sandy Buglass – guitars 
 Tony "Rico" Richardson – saxophone, flute 
 Colin Graham – trumpet, flugelhorn 
 Fiasco – additional programming 
 Mads Hauge – vocals, all instruments ; programming ; guitar, background vocals ; mandolin, keyboards, bass 
 Abe Laboriel Jr. – bass 
 Nathan East – bass 
 Aaron Sterling – drums 
 Adrian Gurvitz – guitar, keyboards 
 Stevie Wonder – harmonica 
 J'Anna Jacoby – violin 
 Joel Pargman – violin 
 Tom Lea – viola 
 John Krovoza – cello 
 John "JT" Thomas – piano 
 Noah Agruss – arrangement 
 CJ Baran – arrangement ; all instruments, programming, background vocals 
 Marty James – vocals 
 Toby Gad – all instruments, programming 
 Ant Whiting – additional programming, additional bass guitar 
 Tim Baxter – additional string programming 
 George Astasio – guitar, bass, programming 
 Ray Djan – guitar, keyboards, programming 
 Jason Pebworth – keyboards 
 Jon Shave – keyboards, bass, programming 
 Ashton Foster – programming 
 The Arcade – additional programming 
 Tinchy Stryder – vocals 
 Jaz Rogers – all instruments, programming 
 Phil Thornalley – piano, glockenspiel, bass, background vocals ; Wurlitzer electric piano 
 Everton Nelson – violin 
 Rick Koster – violin 
 Bruce White – viola 
 Ian Burdge – cello 
 Elroy "Spoonface" Powell – background vocals 
 Patrick Warren – string arrangements, keyboards 
 John Legend – piano 
 David Piltch – bass 
 Timothy Young – guitar 
 Daphne Chen – violin 
 Eric Gorfain – violin 
 Lauren Chipman – viola 
 Richard Dodd – cello 
 Patrick "Jester" Jordan-Patrikios – keyboards, programming 
 Andrew Frampton – keyboards, programming, all guitars, bass 
 Steve Kipner – percussion 
 Katie Stevens – background vocals 
 Andrew Hey – guitar 
 Ash Soan – drums 
 Ben Epstein – bass 
 Tim "Wacko Jacko" Jackson – piano 
 John Thirkell – trumpet 
 Phil Smith – tenor saxophone 
 Richard "Biff" Stannard – keys, programming 
 Ash Howes – keys, programming 
 Seton Daunt – guitar 
 Emma Rohan – backing vocals 
 Benjamin Gordon  Benji Boko – keyboards

Technical

 Mr Hudson – production, engineering 
 Andy Savours – mixing 
 Tim Debney – mastering 
 Brian Kidd – production 
 Tebey Ottoh – vocal production 
 Chris Utley – engineering 
 Wesley Michene – engineering 
 Jimmy Douglass – mixing 
 Rusko – production 
 Anne Preven – mixing 
 Alex G. – additional engineering, additional vocal production 
 Tim Powell – production 
 Phil Tan – mixing 
 Andrei Basirov – production assistance 
 Colin Leonard – mastering 
 Mads Hauge – production, mixing, recording 
 Phil Thornalley – production 
 Adrian Gurvitz – production 
 Jaycen Joshua – mixing 
 Jesus Garnica – mixing assistance 
 Stuart Schenk – recording engineering 
 Chris Thompson – recording engineering 
 Captain Hook  CJ Baran – production, mixing, engineering 
 Larry Goetz – additional mixing 
 Lee Slater – engineering 
 Toby Gad – production ; mixing 
 Ant Whiting – vocal production, mixing 
 Daniel Aslet – additional vocal engineering 
 Jaz Rogers – vocal recording ; production, engineering 
 The Invisible Men – production, mixing 
 Eagle Eye – production 
 Greg "The Wizard" Fleming – mixing 
 The Arcade – additional production 
 Jamie Snell – mixing 
 John Legend – production 
 Patrick Warren – production 
 Ryan Freeland – mixing, instrument recording 
 Jason Agel – lead vocals recording 
 Andrew Frampton – production 
 Steve Kipner – production 
 Patrick "Jester" Jordan-Patrikios – production 
 Dan Frampton – mixing 
 Anselmo Washington – mixing assistance 
 The Underdogs – production 
 Harvey Mason Jr. – mixing 
 Andrew Hey – recording 
 David Boyd – recording assistance 
 Dabling Harward – recording assistance 
 Michael Daley – recording assistance 
 The Matrix – production, recording, mixing 
 Aaron Renner – recording, mixing 
 Richard "Biff" Stannard – production 
 Ash Howes – production 
 Benjamin Gordon  Benji Boko – remix, additional production

Artwork
 Tom Bird – creative direction
 Sheryl Nields – photography
 Salvador Design – artwork, design

Charts

Weekly charts

Year-end charts

Certifications

Release history

Notes

References

2011 albums
Albums produced by Ant Whiting
Albums produced by John Legend
Albums produced by the Matrix (production team)
Albums produced by Mr Hudson
Albums produced by Richard Stannard (songwriter)
Albums produced by Toby Gad
Albums produced by the Underdogs (production team)
Mercury Records albums
Pixie Lott albums